Fingerprints is the sixth studio album by American country music ensemble Eli Young Band. The work was released on 16 June 2017. The album includes the single "Saltwater Gospel".

Critical reception
Rating it 3 out of 5 stars, Stephen Thomas Erlewine of Allmusic wrote that "By stripping away some of the gloss, it's easier to hear how the Eli Young Band have both melodic muscle and musical variety."

Track listing 
 "Saltwater Gospel" (Ross Copperman, Nicolle Galyon, Ashley Gorley) - 3:08
 "Fingerprints" (Copperman, Josh Osborne, Mike Eli, James Young) - 3:02
 "Never Again" (Ryan Hurd, Jimmy Robbins, Laura Veltz) - 2:58
 "Old Songs" (Andrew DeRoberts, Eli, Adam Hambrick, Jason Nix) - 3:40
 "Drive" (Copperman, Eli, Gorley, Tom Douglas) - 3:33
 "Skin & Bones" (Phil Barton, Eli, Lori McKenna) - 4:01 
 "A Heart Needs a Break" (Copperman, Osborne, Shane McAnally) - 2:39
 "Once" (Eli, Young, Osborne, Veltz) - 2:47
 "Never Land" (Copperman, Jon Nite, Eli, Young) - 3:24
 "God Love the Rain" (Erik Dylan, Eli, Jason Nix) - 3:37
 "The Days I Feel Alone" (Andrew DeRoberts, Eli, Nix, Hambrick) - 3:06

Personnel
Credits adapted from AllMusic.

Eli Young Band
Mike Eli - lead vocals, background vocals
Jon Jones - bass guitar, background vocals
Chris Thompson - drums, percussion, background vocals
James Young - acoustic guitar, electric guitar, harmonica, background vocals

Additional Musicians
Ross Copperman - acoustic guitar, electric guitar, keyboards, mandolin, percussion, programming, background vocals
Dan Dugmore - steel guitar
Carolyn Dawn Johnson - background vocals
Cale Richardson - acoustic guitar, banjo, mandolin
Mike Rojas - accordion
Laura Veltz - background vocals
Derek Wells - acoustic guitar, electric guitar

Chart positions

Album

Singles

References 

2017 albums
Eli Young Band albums
Big Machine Records albums
Albums produced by Ross Copperman
Albums produced by Jeremy Stover